Joaquim Fernando Ferreira Murça (born 7 October 1954 in Costa da Caparica, Setúbal District) is a Portuguese retired footballer who played as a left back.

Personal
His is the younger brother of Alfredo Murça.

External links

1954 births
Living people
Portuguese footballers
Association football defenders
Primeira Liga players
Liga Portugal 2 players
F.C. Barreirense players
Sporting CP footballers
Portimonense S.C. players
Vitória S.C. players
C.F. Os Belenenses players
Gil Vicente F.C. players
Portugal international footballers
Sportspeople from Almada